Estadio Luis Tróccoli is a multi-use stadium in Montevideo, Uruguay.  It is currently used primarily for football matches and is the home of CA Cerro.  The stadium holds 25,000 spectators and was built in 1964.

References

Sports venues completed in 1964
Luis Troccoli
Luis Troccoli
C.A. Cerro
Villa del Cerro